These are the matches that Roma have played in European football competitions. The club's first entry into European football was the 1958–60 Inter-Cities Fairs Cup, with their first official entry in the 1969–70 European Cup Winners' Cup, a competition where it had an Italian record six-time appearences. The club has played three finals. In the 1983–84 European Cup, their first entry in the competition, they lost to Liverpool on penalties at their own Stadio Olimpico, and in the 1990–91 UEFA Cup they lost the final 2–1 on aggregate to compatriots Inter Milan. They won the 2021–22 UEFA Europa Conference League by beating Feyenoord 1–0 in the final.

UEFA-organised seasonal competitions 
Roma's score listed first.

European Cup / UEFA Champions League

European Cup Winners' Cup

UEFA Cup / UEFA Europa League

UEFA Europa Conference League

FIFA-only recognized seasonal competitions

Inter-Cities Fairs Cup

Overall record

By competition 
As of 16 March 2023.

Source: UEFA.comPld = Matches played; W = Matches won; D = Matches drawn; L = Matches lost; GF = Goals for; GA = Goals against; GD = Goal difference.

See also

 Football in Italy
 European Club Association

References

Europe
R